Magomed Kurbanov may refer to:
 Magomed Kurbanov (boxer)
 Magomed Kurbanov (wrestler)
 Magomed Kurbanov (footballer)